Smoke Signal is a 1955 American Western film directed by Jerry Hopper and starring Dana Andrews and Piper Laurie.

Plot
Cavalry officer Brett Halliday is facing a court-martial for treason over his defection to a Ute tribe that has been making raids on soldiers. After a bloody attack at the fort, survivors ford the Colorado River in boats, fleeing for their lives. They include the captain now in charge, plus Laura Evans, daughter of the dead commanding officer, and Lt. Ford, who is in love with Laura.

Harper is intent on bringing Halliday to justice. Ford falls to his death from a cliff while fighting with Halliday, who helps the others fend off another attack. A grateful Capt. Harper can't bring himself to set Halliday free, but hints that he will not interfere if Halliday should escape. Laura hopes to see him again as Halliday gets away.

Cast
 Dana Andrews as Brett Halliday
 Piper Laurie as Laura Evans
 Rex Reason as Lt. Ford
 William Talman as Capt. Harper
 Milburn Stone as Sgt. Miles
 Douglas Spencer as Garode
 Gordon Jones as Cpl. Rogers
 William Schallert as Pvt. Livingston
 Robert Wilke as 1st Sgt. Daly
 Bill Phipps as Pvt. Poster
 Pat Hogan as Delche
 Peter Coe as Ute Prisoner

See also
 List of American films of 1955

References

External links
 
 
 

1955 films
1955 Western (genre) films
American Western (genre) films
Films directed by Jerry Hopper
Films shot in Utah
Universal Pictures films
Western (genre) cavalry films
1950s English-language films
1950s American films